Jorzolino Falkenstein (born 26 November 1988) is a Dutch professional footballer who plays for Rayo Cantabria as a striker.

Club career
Falkenstein played as a striker in the Helmond Sport academy and for FC Oss in the Dutch Eerste Divisie before moving to Spanish fourth-tier club Crevillente Deportivo after a trial at third level FC Cartagena did not work out. He returned to Oss in 2016

References

External links
 Voetbal International profile 

1988 births
Living people
Footballers from Rotterdam
Association football forwards
Dutch footballers
VV Capelle players
BVV Barendrecht players
TOP Oss players
Eerste Divisie players
Tercera División players
Dutch expatriate footballers
Expatriate footballers in Spain
Dutch expatriate sportspeople in Spain